The Cook Islands has competed in eight Summer Olympic Games. It has never competed in the Winter Games. The Cook Islands has yet to win a medal .

The Cook Islands is the only one of the associated territories of New Zealand to compete at the Olympic Games, Niue and Tokelau having not yet done so as of 2020.

Medal tables

Medals by Summer Games

See also
 List of flag bearers for the Cook Islands at the Olympics
 List of participating nations at the Summer Olympic Games
 List of participating nations at the Winter Olympic Games

External links
 
 
 

 
Olympics